A robot kit is a special construction kit for building robots, especially autonomous mobile robots.

Toy robot kits are also supplied by several companies. They are mostly made of plastics elements like Lego Mindstorms, rero Reconfigurable Robot kit, the Robotis Bioloid, Robobuilder, the ROBO-BOX-3.0 (produced by Inex), and the lesser-known KAI Robot (produced by Kaimax), or aluminium elements like Lynxmotion's Servo Erector Set and the qfix kit. Some robots, such as Ebdot, come ready-assembled.

The kits can consist of: structural elements, mechanical elements, motors (or other actuators), sensors and a controller board to control the inputs and outputs of the robot. In some cases, the kits can be available without electronics as well, to provide the user the opportunity to use his or her own.

Robot kits

Arduino controlling Tamiya (or another) kit
Cubelets
Lego Mindstorms
Lynxmotion
Qfix robot kit
Robotis Bioloid
Stiquito
Tetrix Robotics Kit
WonderBorg

See also

.dwg
Adaptable robotics
Domestic robot
Open Design Alliance
Open hardware
Phidget
Rapid prototyping
Robotics suite

External links
 Mobile Robot (MURVV) kit

References

Adaptable robotics